The Broyles-Darwin House is a historic mansion in Dayton, Tennessee, U.S.. It was built circa 1860 for Stephen Sanders Decatur Broyles. Broyles served in the Confederate States Army during the American Civil War of 1861–1865. By 1908, the house was purchased by James Robert Darwin. It has been listed on the National Register of Historic Places since July 9, 1997.

References

Houses on the National Register of Historic Places in Tennessee
Houses completed in 1860
Buildings and structures in Rhea County, Tennessee